Lisa Genova (born November 22, 1970) is an American neuroscientist and author. She self-published her debut novel Still Alice (2007), about a  Harvard University professor who suffers early onset Alzheimer's disease. The book gained popularity and was acquired by Simon & Schuster; it was published in January 2009 by Pocket Books (now Gallery Books). There are over 2.6 million copies in print, and it has been translated into 37 languages. It was chosen as one of the thirty titles for World Book Night 2013. The book was adapted into a film in 2014 and won the Academy Award for Best Actress for Julianne Moore's highly acclaimed performance as Alice Howland.

Genova has written fiction about characters dealing with neurological disorders. Gallery Books published her next three novels, Left Neglected, Love Anthony, and Inside the O'Briens, all New York Times bestsellers.

Life and science career
Genova graduated valedictorian, summa cum laude, Phi Beta Kappa from Bates College with a BS degree in biopsychology, and in 1998 she received a PhD in neuroscience from Harvard University.

She did research at Massachusetts General Hospital East, Yale Medical School, McLean Hospital, and the National Institutes of Health.  Genova taught neuroanatomy at Harvard Medical School fall 1996.

Literary and related career

Still Alice

Her first novel was Still Alice (2007), about a woman who suffers early-onset Alzheimer's disease. The central character, Alice Howland, is a 50-year-old cognitive psychology professor at Harvard and a world-renowned linguistics expert. She is married to an equally successful husband, and they have three grown children. The disease takes hold swiftly, and it changes Alice's relationship with her family and the world.

Genova self-published the book in 2007 with iUniverse.

The book was later acquired by Simon & Schuster and published in January 2009 by Pocket Books (now Gallery Books). It was on The New York Times best seller list for more than 59 weeks. There are over 2.6 million copies in print, and it has been translated into 37 languages.

The book was later adapted for the stage by Christine Mary Dunford for the Lookingglass Theatre Company in Chicago. The play was produced from April 10 – May 19, 2013.

Neon Park Productions and Killer Films produced a film adaptation of Still Alice in 2014, starring Julianne Moore as Alice, and co-starring Alec Baldwin, Kristen Stewart, and Kate Bosworth. Moore won an Academy Award for Best Actress at the 87th Academy Awards for her role.

Left Neglected

Left Neglected (2011) tells the story of a woman who suffers from left neglect (also called hemispatial or unilateral neglect), caused by a traumatic brain injury.  As she struggles to recover, she learns that she must embrace a simpler life. She begins to heal when she attends to elements left neglected in herself, her family, and the world around her. It was a New York Times bestseller, the #1 Indie Next Pick for January 2011, the Borders "Book You’ll Love" for January 2011, and the #4 Indie Reading Group Pick for summer 2011. Left Neglected was chosen by the Richard and Judy bookclub in the UK.

Love Anthony

Love Anthony her third New York Times bestseller was published by Gallery Books in September 2012; the main character is Anthony, a nonverbal boy with autism. This story goes inside the mind of autism and how he affects two women. An October 2012 Indie Next pick and a People Magazine Great Read.

Inside the O'Briens
Inside the O'Briens was published by Gallery Books in April 2015. It focuses on members of the O'Brien family, several of whom have inherited Huntington's disease, and how the disease affects their lives and relationships. It was nominated for the Goodreads Choice Award for Fiction in 2015. It was a #1 hardcover fiction title in Canada and a New York Times bestseller.

Every Note Played
Every Note Played is Genova's fifth novel and was released in March 2018. It follows the main character, a pianist by trade, as he discovers and lives with a diagnosis of ALS.

Audiobooks 
 2009: Still Alice (Audible, read by Lisa Genova)
 2015: "Inside the O'Briens (Audible, read by Skipp Suddwith)
 2018: Every Note Played (Audible, afterword read by Lisa Genova)
 2021: Remember: The Science of Memory and the Art of Forgetting ( Audible, read by Lisa Genova )

TV and film
Since her first novel was published, Genova has become a professional speaker about Alzheimer's disease. She has been a guest on The TODAY Show, Dr. Oz, CNN, PBS News Hour, and the Diane Rehm Show. She appeared in the documentary film To Not Fade Away. It is a follow-up to the Emmy Award-winning film, Not Fade Away (2009), about Marie Vitale, a woman who was diagnosed with Alzheimer's disease at the age of 45.

Awards and honors
On April 23, 2015, it was announced that Genova will receive the third annual Pell Center Prize for Story in the Public Square, an award "recognizing a contemporary storyteller whose work has had a significant impact on the public dialogue". The award is bestowed by the Pell Center for International Relations and Public Policy at Salve Regina University.

Genova was also awarded with the Sargent and Eunice Shriver Profiles in Dignity Award,  which recognizes individuals whose actions have promoted greater understanding of Alzheimer's and its effects on diagnosed individuals, families and caregivers. She received the Abe Burrows Entertainment Award for the film Still Alice, Global Genes - Fourth Annual RARE Champions of Hope Award, Bates College Sesquicentennial Award and the American College of Neuropsychopharmacology Media Award for Informing the Public about Treatment and Ongoing Research in Medical Illness.

The Alzheimer's Association awarded Genova the Rita Hayworth Award on May 7, 2016.

Genova was awarded an honorary degree from Bates College, in Lewiston, Maine on May 29, 2016.

Personal life
Genova was married and had a daughter in the year 2000. She started writing full-time in 2004 following her divorce.

References

External links

 
Simon & Schuster Author Page
 Lisa Genova interviewed on Conversations from Penn State
 Lisa Genova's Official Wattpad Profile

1970 births
21st-century American novelists
21st-century American women writers
American neuroscientists
American writers of Italian descent
American women academics
American women neuroscientists
American women novelists
American women scientists
Bates College alumni
Harvard Medical School faculty
Harvard University alumni
Living people
McLean Hospital people
Novelists from Massachusetts